Mark Christopher Smith (born November 23, 1955) is a retired Major League Baseball pitcher. He played during one season at the major league level for the Oakland Athletics. He was drafted by the Baltimore Orioles in the 9th round of the  amateur draft. He played his first professional season with their Class A-Advanced Miami Orioles in 1978, and his last with the Oakland Athletics in 1983.

He is the head coach of the Canadian women's national softball team. He coached them at the 2020 Summer Olympics and won a bronze medal.

References

Sources
"Mark Smith Statistics - MLB". The Baseball Cube. 7 January 2008.
"Mark Smith Statistics - AAA". The Baseball Cube. 7 January 2008.

External links

Pura Pelota

1955 births
Living people
Alexandria Dukes players
American Eagles baseball players
American University alumni
Baseball players from Virginia
Bluefield Orioles players
Charlotte O's players
Ferrum College alumni
Ferrum Panthers baseball players
Major League Baseball pitchers
Miami Orioles players
Oakland Athletics players
Rochester Red Wings players
Sportspeople from Alexandria, Virginia
Tacoma Tigers players
Tigres de Aragua players
American expatriate baseball players in Venezuela